"Go Square Go!" is a song by Scottish Indie rock band Glasvegas. The song was written by the band's singer and guitarist James Allan. It was released as the band's debut 7" single through WaKS on 30 October 2006, as well as a download.

The band re-recorded the song and included it on their self-titled debut album in 2008. The song was recorded at Central Sound Studios in Glasgow, Scotland. The song was produced by James Allan and recorded and engineered by Kevin Burleigh.

Track listings
Songs and lyrics by James Allan. Music by Glasvegas.

7" (WaKS003S); download
 "Go Square Go!" – 3:02
 "Legs 'n' Show" – 2:54

Promo CD-R (released October 2008)
 "Go Square Go" (Badlands Remix by Does It Offend You, Yeah?) – 4:13

Personnel 
 James Allan –  vocals guitar,
 Rab Allan – electric guitar
 Paul Donoghue – bass
 Caroline McKay – drum

 James Allan – Producer
 Kevin Burleigh - Engineer
 Jimmy Neilson – Assistant

Release history

References

External links 
 "Go Square Go" lyrics

2006 songs
2006 debut singles
Glasvegas songs
Songs written by James Allan (musician)